Jessel Allen Carneiro (born 14 July 1990) is an Indian professional footballer who plays as left-back and is the captain of Indian Super League club Kerala Blasters.

Club career

Youth career
Jessel was born in Curtorim, a town in Southern Goa. He started his youth career at Raya FC and later went on to play for his local club FC Curtorim Gymkhana.

Early career:2012–2019 
In 2012, he signed for Dempo S.C and spent two years there before moving to Pune F.C on a loan deal for the 2014–15  season. In 2016, he signed for  FC Bardez which plays in the Goa Professional League. He was signed again by his former club Dempo S.C in 2018. He also captained the Goan football team during the 2018–19 Santosh Trophy and led them into the semi-finals. Jessel was also one of the key players for Dempo S.C as they finished second place in the 2018–19 Goa Professional League.

2019–Present : Kerala Blasters

2019–2020 : ISL debut 

Jessel arrived at Kerala Blasters after an impressive stint with Dempo SC in Goa Professional League and for the Goa football team in the Santosh Trophy. Reportedly, the club paid a transfer fee of around ₹18 lakhs to the Goan club to acquire his services. 

He made his debut for Blasters against ATK on 20 October 2019 where Blasters won the match by 2–1. Though Blasters had an ordinary season, Jessel's performance was one of the revelations during 2019-20 ISL. He was a mainstay at the back for the Blasters and provided five assists, made 78 clearances, 28 tackles, 22 blocks and 22 interceptions. He also made 746 passes, the highest among any players from the Blasters with a passing rate of 41.44 per game, with an accuracy of 72.65 percent. He was the only player in the squad to play the entire minutes for the team during the season.

2020–present 

On 1 July 2020, Kerala Blasters officially announced that they have extended the contract of Jessel till 2023. On 18 November 2020, Jessel was named as one of the vice-captains of the club. On 27 December 2020, Jessel captained the Blasters for the first time, in a 2–0 win against Hyderabad FC. He captained the club in most of the remaining matches of the season when the first choice captain Sergio Cido was ruled out of the season due to an ankle injury.

He was named in the Kerala Blasters squad for the 2021 Durand Cup, where he played all three matches for the club. On 13 November 2021, Jessel was appointed as the permanent club captain ahead of the 2021-22 season. He played his first match of the season in the season opener against ATK Mohun Bagan FC, which they lost 4–2. In the Kerala Blasters' 1–0 victory over Hyderabad FC on 9 January 2022, Jessel picked up an injury during the stoppage time, and was carried-out of the field. In the next day, the Blasters stated that he was contracted with a shoulder injury, and would be out of action for an extended period of time. On 19 January, he underwent a successful surgery on his left AC joint.

Jessel made his return in Blasters' 3–1 victory over East Bengal on 7 October 2022 in the 2022–23 Indian Super League season opener. After the fifth league against Mumbai City FC on 28 October, where the Blasters lost 2–0, Jessel was mostly used as a substitute. He made his return to the starting eleven on 26 December against Odisha FC in a home game.

Career statistics
As of matches played till 2 January 2021

Honours

Club

Kerala Blasters FC 

 Indian Super League runner up: 2021–22.

References

External sources

Indian footballers
Kerala Blasters FC players
1990 births
Living people
Association football fullbacks
Dempo SC players
Footballers from Goa
Pune FC players
I-League players
Indian Super League players